This is a list of properties and districts in Houston County, Georgia that are listed on the National Register of Historic Places (NRHP).

Current listings

|}

References

Houston
Buildings and structures in Houston County, Georgia